Kembo Kibato (born September 16, 2000) is a Canadian professional soccer player who plays as an attacking midfielder for USL Championship side Hartford Athletic
.

Playing career
Kibato played youth soccer with the North Toronto Nitros. In 2016, he debuted with the senior team in League1 Ontario, making two substitute appearances. The following season, he joined the senior squad full-time, scoring 4 goals in 19 appearances, and was named a league third-team all-star.

In 2017, he played with Team Ontario at the 2017 Canada Summer Games, helping them win the gold medal.

In 2017, Kibato joined the Toronto FC Academy.

In 2019, he attended training camp with Forge FC of the Canadian Premier League, but did not ultimately sign with the club.

On July 18, 2019, Kibato signed with Danish 2nd Division side FC Helsingør. Kibato left on January 14, 2020 without making an official first team appearance, having only played in friendlies.

On March 7, 2020, Kibato joined USL Championship side Rio Grande Valley FC. He made his debut for RGVFC on July 11, 2020, appearing as an 83rd-minute substitute during a 1–0 loss to El Paso Locomotive. He scored his first professional goal on August 8 against Austin Bold FC. In October, he was named to the USL Championship Team of the Week after recording two assists in  a 4-2 victory against OKC Energy FC in the season finale.

On April 9, 2021, Kibato moved on a season-long loan to USL Championship side FC Tulsa. At the end of the season, he was named the team's Newcomer of the Year. On December 29, Tulsa announced they had signed Kibato to a permanent deal ahead of the 2022 season. Following the 2022 season, Tulsa opted to buyout Kibato's contract at the club.

On December 12, 2022, Kibato was announced as a new signing for USL Championship side Hartford Athletic ahead of their 2023 season.

Career statistics

Club

References

External links

2000 births
Living people
Association football midfielders
Canadian soccer players
Soccer players from Toronto
North Toronto Nitros players
FC Helsingør players
Rio Grande Valley FC Toros players
FC Tulsa players
Hartford Athletic players
USL Championship players
Canadian expatriate sportspeople in Denmark
Canadian expatriate soccer players
Black Canadian soccer players
Expatriate men's footballers in Denmark
Canadian expatriate sportspeople in the United States
Expatriate soccer players in the United States